Sankara Valli is an Indian politician and incumbent Member of the Legislative Assembly of Tamil Nadu. She was elected to the Tamil Nadu legislative assembly as a Dravida Munnetra Kazhagam candidate from Acharapakkam constituency in  2006 election.

References 

Dravida Munnetra Kazhagam politicians
Living people
21st-century Indian women politicians
21st-century Indian politicians
Year of birth missing (living people)
Tamil Nadu MLAs 2006–2011
Women members of the Tamil Nadu Legislative Assembly